Sally Elizabeth Bundock (née Jackson) (born 1972) is a British news presenter who presents The Briefing on BBC One, BBC World News and the BBC News Channel. She joined World Business Report in September 2002 and she presents its early morning edition, programming viewed mostly by audiences in European and international markets. Bundock has presented the 5am hour on BBC One, BBC World News and the BBC News Channel since the early 2000s.

Early life
Bundock was born in 1972. She has three sisters. She was educated at Robert Smyth School and completed an undergraduate degree in public administration at the Polytechnic of Wales, then moved to London to obtain a postgraduate diploma in journalism at City University London.

Career
Bundock is a financial journalist and presenter who began covering business news in the mid-1990s when she worked for Bloomberg. Since then she has covered many momentous events including World Economic Forums, G7 conferences and historic EU Summits. During 2007 she became a BBC news business news anchor for the breakfast news slot, often presenting with Jonathan Charles or David Jessel. She works at the BBC as a world news presenter, and is known to occasionally speak at media and journalistic events. Since 2017, she has been the solo anchor of the breakfast slot aimed at European, Middle Eastern and African audiences.

World Business Report

World Business Report was launched in September 2001 and offers a blend of news, business and sport to reflect the demands of the global business community. She joined the programme in September 2002, when it was part of The World Today. In the past she has also presented World News Today: Business Edition, which later became Business Live in 2015, and Worklife in 2019, of which she is currently the lead presenter.

Personal life
She married Paul Bundock, from Durban, South Africa in 1999 in Market Harborough, Leicestershire; he died in June 2017 from a rare form of cancer called carcinoid tumors. She has three sons. She lives in Beaconsfield, Buckinghamshire.

References

External links
 World Business Report: Sally Bundock at BBC Online
 TV Newsroom

Video clips
 BBC News in 2009

Living people
Alumni of City, University of London
Alumni of the University of South Wales
BBC Radio 5 Live presenters
BBC World News
British business and financial journalists
Date of birth missing (living people)
1972 births